Myrciaria una is a species of plant in the family Myrtaceae. First described in 2019, it is a tree or treelet with blackish fruit, and was previously misidentified as Myrciaria ferruginea.

Etymology 
From una, the Tupi word for black, referring to the colour of the fruit.

Description 
Myrciaria una is a tree that reaches between 4 and 7m tall. Its leaves are opposite, between 3.5 and 11.5cm long and between 1.3 and 5.1cm wide. The plant produces purplish to blackish fruit up to 20mm in diameter, with up to two seeds.

Distribution 
Myrciaria una is endemic to the subcanopy of the atlantic coastal forest in the states of Ceará, Pernambuco, Alagoas and Bahia in north-eastern Brazil.

Conservation status 
It has been proposed that Myrciaria una is endangered, due to farming, urban expansion, and the historical fragmentation of the atlantic coastal rainforest in north-eastern Brazil.

References

una
Crops originating from the Americas
Crops originating from Brazil
Tropical fruit
Flora of South America
Endemic flora of Brazil
Fruits originating in South America
Cauliflory
Fruit trees
Berries
Plants described in 2019